Rachel Anne "Rae" Morris (born 2 September 1992) is an English singer and songwriter. She released her debut album, Unguarded, in 2015. Her second album, Someone Out There, was released in January 2018.

Early life
Morris was born in Blackpool, Lancashire, England, and started playing the piano when she was four years old. She attended St. George's School and then studied A-levels in music and drama at Cardinal Newman College in Preston, Lancashire. She worked as a waitress at the grounds of Blackpool F.C.

Career

2011: Early live appearances

Morris gigged in Blackpool and around the North-West England during her college studies. She attracted the attention of BBC Radio Lancashire presenter Sean McGinty, who put her forward to perform on the BBC Introducing stage at the Reading and Leeds Festivals in August 2011. She was signed to Universal Music Publishing Group the same month and to Atlantic Records in September 2011. Morris had received attention from other labels but chose Atlantic because they "would take it slow" and "didn't blow any smoke up my arse".

During this period she was mentored by fellow Blackpool singer-songwriter Karima Francis, who helped develop her songwriting skills. She was also in a two-year relationship with Francis, which she said inspired the songs on her debut album "about going through that, exploring that sexuality and those feelings for the first time. Then coming out the other side of that as well, so that's the album".

2012–2014: EP releases
Morris released her debut single in March 2012, "Don't Go", following its use in the final episode of the sixth series of the television drama series Skins. She recorded an EP, For You, which she sold exclusively at her live performances in mid 2012, and in November released a second EP, Grow. Another EP, From Above, followed in 2013. Alongside her solo gigs during 2012 and 2013, Morris was a support act for artists including Bombay Bicycle Club, Lianne La Havas, Noah and the Whale, and Tom Odell. She contributed guest vocals to three tracks on Bombay Bicycle Club's 2014 album So Long, See You Tomorrow, including the single "Luna". Also in 2014, Morris co-wrote and featured on the Clean Bandit song "Up Again" (from their debut album New Eyes). Rae Morris was recently the MarkMeets featured artist of the month December 2014  Rae also opened for George Ezra on his European tour, as well as embarking on her own headlining UK tour.

2014–2015: Unguarded

During 2014, Morris released the singles "Do You Even Know?", "Cold" (featuring Fryars), and "Closer"—each with accompanying EPs—to promote her debut album, Unguarded, which she recorded primarily in Los Angeles with producer Ariel Rechtshaid. Morris was longlisted in the BBC Sound of 2015 poll, and Unguarded was released in January 2015 alongside the single "Under the Shadows", with another headlining tour following in February. Unguarded, which also features production from Jim Eliot and Fryars, debuted at number nine on the UK Albums Chart.

Later in 2015, Morris appeared in a television advertisement for fashion retailer Boohoo that featured the album's fifth single, "Love Again". She featured on Sivu's single "The Nile" and performed at festivals including Bestival, Glastonbury, Lytham Festival, T in the Park, and Truck Festival. The sixth single from Unguarded, "Don't Go", was released in association with breast cancer awareness charity Coppafeel!.

2018–2019: Someone Out There
Morris began work on the follow up to Unguarded in late 2015. Touring to promote the album began in March 2017 and included a concert at Concorde 2 in Brighton supported by PAULi and Saskia Maxwell. In September a wider tour included Norwich, Nottingham, Salisbury Arts Centre, Leeds and Islington in London.

Working prominently with Fryars, Morris opted for a more electronic-oriented sound for her second album. Between July 2017 and October 2018, Morris released seven singles to promote the album - "Reborn", "Do It", "Atletico (The Only One)", "Push Me to My Limit", "Lower the Tone", "Someone Out There" and "Dancing With Character" - as well as various remixes. The album, titled Someone Out There, was released on 2 February 2018.

In July 2018, the song "Reborn" from Someone Out There was featured in the BBC's closing montage from the 2018 FIFA World Cup.

In October 2018, Morris said she was "going away for a few months to write the next era."

On 19 November 2018, Spice Girl Melanie C released "High Heels" featuring Sink the Pink, which was co-written with Morris.

On 4 June 2021, Morris released "Fish n Chips", a collaboration with TikTok star, grime artist, and fellow Blackpool native Soph Aspin.

2022: "No Woman Is an Island" and Rachel@Fairyland
On 18 February 2022, Morris announced she was supporting Tom Odell for several nights on his Monsters UK tour, and a single, "No Woman Is an Island", would be released on 25 February. In July 2022, her third album Rachel@Fairyland sold 1,098 copies in its first week to debut at number 150 in the UK Albums Chart, which was 130 places lower than her second album, Someone Out There, charted in 2018.

Personal life
Morris is in a relationship with frequent collaborator Fryars. Her brother William is married to Lucy Rose. On 26 May 2021, Morris announced via her Instagram that she was pregnant with her and Fryars' first child; their daughter, Marla, was born in June 2021.

Discography

Studio albums

Extended plays

Singles

Music videos

References

1992 births
Living people
Atlantic Records artists
English pop pianists
English women pop singers
English women singer-songwriters
Musicians from Lancashire
People from Blackpool
21st-century English women singers
21st-century English singers
21st-century pianists
21st-century women pianists